Liriomyza virgula is a species of leaf miner fly in the family Agromyzidae.

Description

Distribution
L. virgula is a Western Palaearctic species known from Belgium, Belarus, Czech Republic, Estonia, Finland, France, Germany, Hungary, Italy, Kazakhstan, Lithuania, Norway, Slovakia, Switzerland, Turkey, and the United Kingdom.

References

Agromyzidae
Insects described in 1946
Diptera of Europe